Dinosaur Sounds is the third album by American ska band Catch 22.

Release
Dinosaur Sounds was released in November 2003. In February 2004, the band toured across the US as part of the Ska Is Dead tour. In April and May 2004, the band went on a sequel tour, dubbed Ska Is Dead and You're Next Tour, with Big D and the Kids Table, Mustard Plug, and Planet Smashers. In June and July, the band supported Reel Big Fish on their North American headlining tour. In August 2004, they went on a week-long tour with Punchline and Bayside. In October 2004, they supported Big D and the Kids Table on the US West Coast Ska Is Dead tour.

Reception

The album received mixed reviews, thanks in part to the band's recent loss of their main vocalist Jeff Davidson. Many critics also disliked the band's departure from their typical ska genre.

Track listing

It is significant that the last five tracks are mislabeled when played on a computer: "Interlude" is labeled as "So Cold"; "Regression" as "Chasing the Moon"; "Chasing the Moon" as "Lamont's Lament"; "Lamont's Lament" as "Untitled Track". This is because "Interlude" was intentionally unlabeled on the jacket as a Hidden Track and incorrectly labelled during mastering.

Personnel
Pat Kays - bass guitar
Ian McKenzie - trombone, vocals
Ryan Eldred - saxophone, vocals
Chris Greer - drum kit
Kevin Gunther - trumpet, vocals
Pat Calpin - guitar

References

Catch 22 (band) albums
2003 albums
Victory Records albums
Albums produced by Steve Evetts